Conant's Hill Site is an archaeological site in Wareham, Massachusetts.  The area, located around Horseshoe Pond just north of Interstate 195, is a multicomponent site that includes both industrial remains dating to the 18th century, and Native American artifacts.  During excavations in 1947, remains of four Native Americans were exhumed, along with a lead ring, evidence that they were post-contact burials.  The site also includes a midden, with prehistoric artifacts dating as far back as the Late Archaic.

The site was listed on the National Register of Historic Places in 1983.

See also
National Register of Historic Places listings in Plymouth County, Massachusetts

References

National Register of Historic Places in Plymouth County, Massachusetts
Wareham, Massachusetts